Cristian "Cuti" Gabriel Romero (born 27 April 1998) is an Argentine professional footballer who plays as a centre-back for  club Tottenham Hotspur and the Argentina national team.

Coming through the youth system, Romero began his senior career in 2016 at Belgrano. He moved to Italy in 2018, playing for Genoa. Romero was purchased by Juventus the following season; he was sent back on loan to Genoa, before being sent on loan to Atalanta in 2020. After being nominated Serie A Best Defender in 2020–21 with Atalanta, the club exercised the option of purchase before promptly loaning Romero to Tottenham with obligation to buy. 

Romero represented Argentina at youth level at the 2017 South American U-20 Championship. He made his senior debut in 2021, and was part of the squad that won the 2021 Copa América and the 2022 FIFA World Cup.

Club career

Belgrano
Having joined the youth team in 2014, Romero was promoted to Argentine Primera División side Belgrano's first team in 2016; his debut came on 28 August, in a league match with Independiente. A month later, Romero played in both of Belgrano's 2016 Copa Sudamericana round of sixteen ties against Coritiba. In two seasons with Belgrano's first-team, he made nineteen appearances in all competitions.

Genoa, Juventus and Atalanta
In July 2018, Romero joined Genoa of Serie A. Romero scored his first senior goal in his second Genoa match, netting in a 2–2 draw with Udinese on 28 October, a match in which he was later sent off. On 9 July 2019 Juventus announced Romero was having a medical ahead of a proposed transfer. 

On 12 July 2019, Juventus announced the permanent acquisition of Romero from Genoa for €26 million, with the player remaining at his former club on loan for the rest of the season.

On 5 September 2020, Romero joined Atalanta on loan until 30 June 2022 with an option to buy. He was elected the best defender of the 2020–21 Serie A season.

Tottenham Hotspur
On 6 August 2021, Juventus announced that Atalanta had activated the option to sign Romero for €16 million. Later that day, Premier League club Tottenham Hotspur announced his signing from Atalanta on an initial season-long loan with an option to make the deal permanent.

Romero made his debut for the club on 15 August, coming on as a late substitute for Pierre-Emile Højbjerg in a match against Manchester City that Tottenham won 1–0. On 19 August 2021, he made his first start in the UEFA Europa Conference League first leg tie against Paços de Ferreira, which ended in a 1–0 defeat. Romero scored his first goal for Tottenham Hotspur in a 2–0 win over Brighton & Hove Albion.

On 30 August 2022, he joined Tottenham Hotspur on a permanent deal with a contract lasting until 2027.

International career

Youth 
Romero has represented Argentina at U20 level, winning seven caps at the 2017 South American U-20 Championship in Ecuador. In April 2017, he was called up for Argentina's training camp ahead of the 2017 FIFA U-20 World Cup in South Korea but was not selected on the tournament squad list. Romero was called up for the U23s in September 2019.

Senior 
Romero made his debut for the senior national team on 3 June 2021 in a World Cup qualifier against Chile, playing the full match. In his following game for Argentina on 8 June, he scored his first international goal, coming from a thumping header against Colombia after only 130 seconds. This goal also broke the record for the fastest ever scored for Argentina in a professional match, surpassing Diego Maradona's goal after 168 seconds against Venezuela in 1985.

In June 2021, he was included in Lionel Scaloni's final Argentina 28-man squad for the 2021 Copa América. Romero was included in the Team of the Tournament at the conclusion, as Argentina won the competition.

Career statistics

Club

International

Scores and results list Argentina's goal tally first, score column indicates score after each Romero goal.

Honours
Argentina
 FIFA World Cup: 2022
 Copa América: 2021
 CONMEBOL–UEFA Cup of Champions: 2022

Individual
 Serie A Best Defender: 2020–21
 Copa América Team of the Tournament: 2021

References

External links

Profile at the Tottenham Hotspur F.C. website

1998 births
Living people
Footballers from Córdoba, Argentina
Argentine footballers
Association football defenders
Club Atlético Belgrano footballers
Genoa C.F.C. players
Juventus F.C. players
Atalanta B.C. players
Tottenham Hotspur F.C. players
Argentine Primera División players
Serie A players
Premier League players
Argentina youth international footballers
Argentina under-20 international footballers
Argentina international footballers
2021 Copa América players
2022 FIFA World Cup players
Copa América-winning players
FIFA World Cup-winning players
Argentine expatriate footballers
Argentine expatriate sportspeople in Italy
Argentine expatriate sportspeople in England
Expatriate footballers in Italy
Expatriate footballers in England